Daniel Foster may refer to:

Danny Foster (footballer) (born 1984), English footballer
Daniel Foster (Australian footballer) (born 1982), former Australian rules footballer
Danny Foster (musician) (born 1979), English pop/soul singer and television personality
Dan Foster (DJ) (1958–2020), American DJ based in Nigeria
Dan Foster (politician) (born 1948), Democratic member of the West Virginia Senate
Dan Foster (physician) (1930–2018), American physician
Daniel Foster (rugby league) (born 1993), Tongan international